Burcu Dolunay (born 17 February 1984 in Izmir, Turkey) is a Turkish female swimmer competing in the freestyle events. She studied at Istanbul University. Dolunay is holder of several national records in freestyle.

She qualified to participate in the 50 m freestyle and 100 m freestyle events at the 2012 Summer Olympics. At the 2013 Mediterranean Games held in Mersin, Turkey, she won two bronze medals in the 50 m freestyle and 4 × 100 m freestyle relay events.

Personal bests
Long course
50 m freestyle 25.22 NR (5 May 2012 - Istanbul, Turkey)
100 m freestyle 55.29 NR (2 May 2012 - Istanbul, Turkey)
4 × 100 m medley relay NR 4:07.56 (27 May 2012 - Debrecen, Hungary)
4 × 100 m freestyle relay NR 3:47.35 (21 June 2013 - Mersin, Turkey)

Short course
50 m freestyle 25.22 NR (11 December 2011 - Szczecin, Poland)
100 m freestyle 55.15 NR (16 December 2011 - Dubai, U.A.E.)
200 m freestyle  2:00.58 NR (14 November 2009 - Berlin, Germany)
100 m individual medley 1:02.58 NR (15 November 2009 - Berlin, Germany)
4×50 m freestyle relay 1:42.82 NR (23 December 2011 - Istanbul, Turkey)
4 × 100 m freestyle relay 3:55.24 NR (2005 - Istanbul, Turkey)
4×50 m medley relay 1:53.48 NR (12 December 2009 - Istanbul, Turkey)

See also
 Turkish women in sports

References

1984 births
Sportspeople from İzmir
Turkish female freestyle swimmers
Turkish female swimmers
Galatasaray Swimming swimmers
Living people
Olympic swimmers of Turkey
Swimmers at the 2012 Summer Olympics
Istanbul University alumni
Mediterranean Games bronze medalists for Turkey
Swimmers at the 2013 Mediterranean Games
Mediterranean Games medalists in swimming
21st-century Turkish sportswomen